Roseomonas aestuarii is a species of Gram negative, strictly aerobic, coccobacilli-shaped, orange-colored bacterium. It was first isolated from an estuarine environment in India, and the new species name was proposed in 2010.

References

External links
Type strain of Roseomonas aestuarii at BacDive -  the Bacterial Diversity Metadatabase

Rhodospirillales
Bacteria described in 2010